İsmail Faikoğlu (born 25 August 1965) is a Turkish wrestler. He competed in the men's freestyle 62 kg at the 1992 Summer Olympics.

References

External links
 

1965 births
Living people
Turkish male sport wrestlers
Olympic wrestlers of Turkey
Wrestlers at the 1992 Summer Olympics
Place of birth missing (living people)
20th-century Turkish people